Birdbrook is a village and civil parish in Essex, England. The village is in the district of Braintree and in the parliamentary constituency of Saffron Walden. The parish is part of the Bumpsteads and Upper Colne parish cluster. It is 93 metres above sea level. According to the 2011 census it had a population of 397. There is a Public House, "The Plough" and a Church, "St Augustine of Canterbury".

Nearby Moyns Park, a Grade I listed Elizabethan country house, is said to have been where Ian Fleming put the finishing touches on his novel From Russia, with Love.

References

http://www.birdbrook.net A Page Dedicated to the Idle of Birdbrook

External links

Villages in Essex
Braintree District